À la vie à l'amor is a Canadian short drama film, directed by Émilie Mannering and released in 2022. Featuring dialogue in English, French and Spanish, the film stars Lex Garcia as Cesar, a man who is emotionally numb from a difficult breakup; for his 30th birthday, he asks his friends and family to let him record their testimonies about the meaning and value of love.

The film premiered at the 2022 Toronto International Film Festival.

The film was a finalist for the 2023 Prix collégial du cinéma québécois for short films, and a Canadian Screen Award nominee for Best Live Action Short Drama at the 11th Canadian Screen Awards.

References

External links

2022 films
2022 short films
2022 drama films
Canadian drama short films
2020s English-language films
2020s French-language films
2020s Spanish-language films
2020s Canadian films
English-language Canadian films
French-language Canadian films
Spanish-language Canadian films